Andy Davies is an English football referee from Hampshire, known for being the only referee in the EFL who formally played for a football team.

Career
Davies began his career as a professional footballer, and had spells at Gillingham, Portsmouth and Yeovil Town. However, at age 28 he was forced to retire due to injury.

His career as a referee began in the 2004–05 season, and he quickly advanced through the levels, before being promoted to the Football League as a referee in the 2012–13 season. He has since refereed over 200 games for the EFL.

For the start of the 2016–17 season, Davies was included as a Select Group 2 referee, which sees him primarily referee in the Championship, for which he has refereed over 80 games.

Matches

Davies refereed the National League Play-Off Semi-Final between Mansfield Town and York City on 7 May 2012 which ended 0–1 (after extra time). He also refereed an international friendly between England U20 and Mexico U20, which ended 4:2 on penalties.

References

Living people
English football referees
Sportspeople from Hampshire
English footballers
Year of birth missing (living people)
Association footballers not categorized by position